Burzum was a Norwegian music project founded by Varg Vikernes in 1991. Although Burzum never played live performances, it became a part of the early Norwegian black metal scene and is considered one of the most influential acts in black metal's history. Vikernes has also released four dark ambient and neofolk albums. The word "burzum" means "darkness" in the black speech, a fictional language crafted by The Lord of the Rings writer J. R. R. Tolkien. Burzum's lyrics and imagery are often inspired by fantasy and Norse mythology, and do not feature the political views for which Vikernes is known. 

Vikernes founded Burzum in 1991 and recorded the first four Burzum albums between January 1992 and March 1993. From 1994 to 2009, Vikernes was imprisoned for the murder of Mayhem guitarist Øystein "Euronymous" Aarseth and the arson of three churches. While imprisoned, he recorded two dark ambient albums using only synthesizers, as he had no access to drums, guitar, or bass. Since his release from prison in 2009, he has recorded several more albums. Vikernes announced the end of Burzum in 2018, but released the project's final album Thulêan Mysteries in 2020.

History

Early years (1988–1992) 

Varg Vikernes began making music in 1988 with the band Kalashnikov. The following year, the name was changed to Uruk-Hai, after the creatures from J. R. R. Tolkien's The Lord of the Rings. In 1990 and 1991, Vikernes played guitar for the death metal band Old Funeral, which also consisted of members who would later form the band Immortal. He appears on the Old Funeral EP Devoured Carcass. Vikernes left Old Funeral in 1991 to concentrate on creating his own musical visions. He had a short-lived project called Satanel, along Abbath Doom Occulta. He then began a solo project under the name Burzum. The word "burzum" means "darkness" in the Black Speech, a language crafted by Tolkien. Soon after recording two demo tapes, he became part of the Norwegian black metal scene. With his demo tapes, he had attracted attention from Øystein "Euronymous" Aarseth of Mayhem, who had just recently formed Deathlike Silence Productions. Aarseth then signed Burzum to the label, and shortly after, Vikernes―under the pseudonym of Count Grishnackh (another name adapted from The Lord of the Rings)―began to record Burzum's self-titled debut album. According to Vikernes' autobiography on his website, he had intended to record the album in the worst recording quality possible (due to this being a typical trademark of the early Norwegian black metal scene), while still making it sound acceptable. Burzum's eponymous debut album was released in 1992, being the second album released on Deathlike Silence Productions. The song "War" from this album had a guest appearance from Euronymous, playing a guitar solo "just for fun", according to Vikernes.

Vikernes has stated that he had never played any live shows with Burzum, though at one point was interested in it, so Samoth of Emperor accompanied him as a session bassist, though only appearing on the Aske EP. Additionally, Erik Lancelot was hired to be the band's drummer, though did not record on any Burzum material, and along with Samoth did not play a live show. Vikernes had by then lost his interest in playing live concerts, and stated that he "didn't even need session musicians anymore". Therefore, Samoth and Lancelot had parted ways with Burzum. Det som engang var was released as Burzum's second album in 1993, recorded in 1992.

Imprisonment (1993–2009) 

May 1994 saw the release of Hvis lyset tar oss, a new album of previously recorded material from 1992. Burzum remained as a solo project until 1994, when Vikernes was arrested for the murder of Euronymous and the burnings of several churches in Norway. During his time in prison, Vikernes released his next album, titled Filosofem, on 1 January 1996. Recorded in March 1993, Filosofem was the last recording Vikernes made before his imprisonment. Burzum / Aske, a compilation comprising the Burzum album and Aske EP, was released in 1995. While imprisoned, Vikernes managed to record two other albums in a dark ambient style. They were released as Dauði Baldrs (1997) and Hliðskjálf (1999). Both of these albums were created with a synthesizer, as Vikernes was prohibited from using any other instruments in prison.

In 1998, all Burzum albums released up to that point were re-released as vinyl picture discs in a special box set called 1992–1997; however Filosofem did not contain "Rundtgåing av den transcendentale egenhetens støtte" due to its length. The regular vinyl issue of Filosofem on Misanthropy had tracks 1–4 plus "Decrepitude II" on side 1 and "Rundtgåing av den transcendentale egenhetens støtte" on side 2.

Post-imprisonment and retirement (2009–2020) 

Soon after being released, Vikernes started writing new tracks (nine metal tracks and an ambient intro and outro) for an upcoming Burzum album. According to Vikernes' recounts, several record companies were interested in releasing his first album in eleven years. He stated about the new album, "I want to take my time, and make it the way I want it. It will be metal, and the fans can expect genuine Burzum."

The album was going to be originally titled Den hvite guden (The White God), but he later decided to change it to Belus, which was released by the independent record label Byelobog Productions (byelobog is the transliteration of "белобог" in Slavic languages, meaning 'white god') on 8 March 2010. It was also announced that a movie would be released in 2010, based on Varg Vikernes' life in the early 1990s. The movie would mainly draw inspiration from the book Lords of Chaos, with the film being of the same name. Vikernes expressed his contempt towards both the movie and the book upon which it is based.

A second new album of original Burzum material, Fallen, was released on 7 March 2011, followed by a compilation album, From the Depths of Darkness, containing re-recordings of tracks from Burzum's self-titled album and Det som engang var, on 28 November 2011. A third new studio album of original material, titled Umskiptar, was released in May 2012. Sôl austan, Mâni vestan ("East of the Sun, West of the Moon"), Burzum's first electronic album since 1999, was released in May 2013. On 27 April 2013, a song was posted on the official YouTube channel of Vikernes, titled "Back to the Shadows". In a blog post, Vikernes stated that "Back to the Shadows" would be the last metal track released by Burzum.

The album The Ways of Yore was released in June 2014.

In June 2018, in a video posted on his YouTube channel, Vikernes stated that "[he had] moved on [from Burzum]", saying "bye bye" to the project.

In July 2018, a YouTube user named Hermann posted unreleased materials of Uruk-Hai from 1988 to 1990 and Burzum's Bergen prison recordings from 1994, which he received from Tiziana Stupia.

In October 2019, Vikernes posted a tweet saying he intended to release another album as Burzum. He announced that the tentative name of the album would be Thulêan Mysteries, which would have 23 songs. The tracks from the album were previously used as background music on Vikernes' YouTube channel, which was taken down the same year. Vikernes also said that the music of Thulêan Mysteries is meant to be used as a background soundtrack for his MYFAROG role-playing game. On 18 December, Vikernes tweeted the album cover for Thulêan Mysteries and announced its release date as 13 March 2020.

Thulêan Mysteries was released on 13 March 2020. Vikernes has stated that it would be the final Burzum album.

Musical style 
Burzum's music includes both straightforward black metal as well as dark ambient, neofolk and neo-medieval music. It is often minimalist and dark, with repetition and simple song structures. Vikernes has described Burzum as a kind of "spell" or recreation of an imaginary world tied in with Pagan history. Each album, he claims, was designed as a kind of "spell" in itself, with each beginning song intending to make the listener more susceptible to "magic", the following songs to inspire a "trance-like state of mind", and the last song to carry the listener into a "world of fantasy" (dreams, for the listener would fall asleep—Burzum was supposed to have been evening music). Vikernes claims the intent to create this fantasy world came from dissatisfaction with the real world. He has stated the "message" of Burzum can be found in the lyrics of the first song of the first album ("Feeble Screams from Forests Unknown").

Burzum's lyrics and imagery are often inspired by fantasy and Norse mythology, and do not feature the far-right political views for which Vikernes is known. In a 2010 interview, Vikernes said: "Burzum is not a political or religious band, or even an anti-religious band. Burzum is music; art if you like, and the interpretation of art lies in the eye of the beholder. I might be Nordic, heterosexual and have a Pagan ideology myself, but why would I expect the fans of my music to be just like me?". Despite the project's apolitical nature, Burzum is included on Meta's Dangerous Individuals and Organizations list.

Burzum's early work was influenced by Tolkien; for example, Vikernes' early moniker "Count Grishnackh" is taken from an orc character called Grishnákh in Tolkien's works. Burzum is a word of the Black Speech of Mordor meaning "darkness" (though Vikernes views what Christians consider "darkness" as "light"), and is inscribed on the One Ring in Tolkien's The Lord of the Rings.

Discography 
Main releases
 Burzum (1992)
 Det som engang var (1993)
 Hvis lyset tar oss (1994)
 Filosofem (1996)
 Dauði Baldrs (1997)
 Hliðskjálf (1999)
 Belus (2010)
 Fallen (2011)
 Umskiptar (2012)
 Sôl austan, Mâni vestan (2013)
 The Ways of Yore (2014)
 Thulêan Mysteries (2020)

EPs
 Aske (1993)

Singles
 "Mythic Dawn" (2015)
 "Forgotten Realms" (2015)
 "Thulean Mysteries" (2015)

Demos and promos
 Burzum Demo (1991)
 Reh/Demo 91 (1991)
 Reh II/Demo 92 (1992)
 Burzum Promo (1992)

Music videos
 "Dunkelheit" (1996)

Compilation albums
 Burzum / Aske (1995)
 Burzum Anthology (2002) (bootleg)
 Draugen – Rarities (2005) (bootleg, mistakenly featuring an Ildjarn track)
 Burzum Anthology (2008)
 From the Depths of Darkness (2011)
 Foreldra (2019)
 Thulê (2019)
 Balder's Død (2021)
 Unreleased Material 1988-1994 (2021)

Box sets
 Burzum 1992–1997 (1998)
 Burzum 1992-1999 (2010)
 XIII (2018)
 In the Arms of Darkness (2019)

Other appearances
 Presumed Guilty (1998) (contributed "Et hvitt lys over skogen")
 Gummo soundtrack (1998) (contributed "Rundtgång Av Den Transcendentale Egenhetens Støtte")
 Fenriz Presents... The Best of Old-School Black Metal (2004) (contributed "Ea, Lord of the Depths")

See also
List of ambient music artists

Notes

References

External links
 

1988 establishments in Norway
2018 disestablishments in France
Norwegian black metal musical groups
Norwegian folk metal musical groups
Norwegian ambient music groups
Dark ambient music groups
Musical groups established in 1991
Musical groups disestablished in 2018
Musical groups reestablished in 2009
Musical groups reestablished in 1998
Musical groups disestablished in 1995
Musical groups reestablished in 2020
Musical groups from Bergen
One-man bands
Things named after Tolkien works